The 2000 Iowa Democratic presidential caucuses, the first nominating contest in the Democratic Party primaries for the 2000 presidential election, took place on January 24, 2000.

Candidates
 Bill Bradley, former Senator from New Jersey
 Al Gore, incumbent Vice President of the United States from Tennessee

Campaign
Vice President Al Gore was seen as the frontrunner for the nomination. Bill Bradley was seen as a non-threat. Al Gore campaigned in Des Moines, Iowa in May 1999. Bradley, knowing he was the outsider, campaigned tirelessly. Gore successfully painted Bradley as aloof and indifferent to the plight of farmers in rural America. The Vice President received the endorsement from the Governor of Iowa Tom Vilsack and Senator Tom Harkin and had a tremendous lead over Senator Bradley. But a devastating loss for the Gore camp was when Bradley got the endorsement of the Des Moines Register. Bradley started to gain momentum and the race become closer. A week before the caucus polls had it 40% to 49% in Gore’s favor. On January 23, 2000, a day before the primary polls had Al Gore winning by 2 or 3 points.

2000 results

Al Gore won 93 of Iowa's 99 counties. Gore even beat Bradley in the Des Moines area. This Caucus had low voter turnout. Bill Bradley lost the rest of the primaries by large margins and Al Gore would eventually lose the general election to Governor of Texas George W. Bush.

See also
 Iowa caucuses
 2000 Iowa Republican presidential caucuses
 2000 Democratic Party presidential primaries

References

Notes

2000
Iowa
Democratic primary